Melissa C. Minor-Brown (born April 19, 1984) is an American politician. She is a Democratic member of the Delaware House of Representatives, representing district 17.

Elections 
In 2018, Minor-Brown won her primary with 56.7% of the vote. She then won after running unopposed in the general election to replace retiring Democrat Michael Mulrooney.

In 2020, Minor-Brown defeated Independent candidate Timothy Collins with 96% of the vote.

References

External links
Official page at the Delaware General Assembly
Campaign site
 

1984 births
Living people
Democratic Party members of the Delaware House of Representatives
Women state legislators in Delaware
African-American state legislators in Delaware
21st-century American women politicians
21st-century American politicians
21st-century African-American women
21st-century African-American politicians
20th-century African-American people
20th-century African-American women